Choyce Point is a headland  southwest of Tent Nunatak on the east coast of Graham Land. A rocky bluff rises behind the point as viewed from Larsen Ice Shelf to which the Falkland Islands Dependencies Survey (FIDS) in 1947 applied the name Cape Choyce. It was named by the UK Antarctic Place-Names Committee for M.A. Choyce, FIDS meteorologist at Hope Bay, 1947.

References 

Headlands of Graham Land
Bowman Coast